83rd Regiment or 83rd Infantry Regiment may refer to:

 Royal Irish Regiment (1992), a unit of the British Army which carries on the lineage of the 83rd Ulster Defense Regiment
 83rd Regiment of Foot (disambiguation), several units of the British Army
 83rd Wallajahbad Light Infantry, a unit of the British Indian Army

 83rd Field Artillery Regiment, United States
 83rd Fighter Aviation Regiment, later Fighter-Bomber regiment, a unit of the Yugoslav Air Force

American Civil War regiments:
 83rd Illinois Volunteer Infantry Regiment, a unit of the Union (Northern) Army
 83rd Indiana Infantry Regiment, a unit of the Union (Northern) Army 
 83rd New York Volunteer Infantry Regiment, a unit of the Union (Northern) Army 
 83rd Ohio Infantry, a unit of the Union (Northern) Army 
 83rd Pennsylvania Infantry, a unit of the Union (Northern) Army

See also
 83rd Division (disambiguation)
 83rd Squadron (disambiguation)